Abd al-Rauf ibn Ali al-Fansuri al-Sinkili (spelling variation Abdurrauf Singkil, 1615–1693 CE) was a well-known Islamic scholar, spiritual leader of the Shattariyya tariqa and the mufti of Aceh Sultanate. He was the confidant of Sultana Safiyat al-Din. He was considered the first person to spread the Shattari Sufi order in Indonesia and Southeast Asia. Many of his students also became disseminators of Islam. He is commonly known as Shaikh Abd al-Rauf al-Sinkili, and also known posthumously in Aceh as Teungku Syiah Kuala, which translates to "Sheikh in the Estuary".

Al-Sinkili was believed to be a native of Singkil, a town on the western coast of Aceh. Beside being called Al-Sinkili, his other attribution (Arabic: nisba) was Al-Fansuri, which relates him to the town of Barus. He could be related to another prominent Sufi poet and writer from that town, Hamzah Fansuri.

Early life 
His full name is Amin al-Din Abd al-Rauf ibn Ali al-Jawi tsuma al-Fansuri al-Sinkili. His family came from Persia or Arabia to Singkil, Aceh in the 13th century, but this is not certain due to lack of the historical records, as well as the fact that his family name is not Arabic. Some experts believe he was an ethnic Minang from Singkil, while others say he is a Batak.

Al-Sinkili's first teacher was probably his own father, Sheikh Ali Fansuri, a well known Acehnese scholar at the time. Later, he went on to study with ulama in Fansur and Banda Aceh. After completing his studies in Banda Aceh, Al-Sinkili went to Mecca for Hajj and to further his education.

Education 
Al-Sinkili was thought to depart to Arabia around 1642. He studied various knowledge of Islamic teaching for around twenty years in many places, including in Doha, Yemen, Jeddah, Mecca, and mostly Madina. While Al-Sinkili was in the Middle East, he became acquainted with Sufi scholars Ahmad Kusyasyi and Mula Ibrahim Kurani, who taught Al-Sinkili to study Sufism.

He listed in his book Umdat al-Muhtajin ila Suluk Maslak al-Mufridin 19 teachers and 27 other scholars with whom he had personal contacts. His two most respected teachers were Ahmad al-Qushashi and Ibrahim al-Kurani. Al-Qushashi gave Al-Sinkili authorization (ijazah) as the formal successor (khalifa) for Shattariyya and Qadiriyya. After Al-Sinkili went back to Aceh, he maintained correspondence with Al-Kurani, and asked for Al-Kurani's opinions regarding religious matters.

Islamic missionary activity 
After finishing his studies of Arabic and Sufism, Sheikh Abd al-Rauf went back to Aceh around 1083 AH/1662, where he established a school. Students came from Aceh and other areas in the Indonesian Archipelago. Some of his students included Sheikh Burhanuddin Ulakan (from Pariaman, West Sumatera), Sheikh Nur Qadim al-Baharuddin (from Semende Panjang, South Sumatera), and Sheikh Abdul Muhyi Pamijahan (from Tasikmalaya, West Java).

Shattariyya tariqa 
Based on Syed Muhammad Naquib al-Attas, Sheikh Abd al-Rauf received an ijaza (permission to teach) from Sheikh Ahmad al-Qusyasyi in Medina after studying for twenty years. Sheikh Abd al-Rauf became the first person to introduce Shattariyya tariqa to the Indonesian Archipelago. His name is also connected with the translation and interpretation of the Quran in Malay language on Al Baydawi's work Anwar al-Tanzil Wa-Asrar al-Ta'wil, which was first published in Istanbul in 1884.

Works 
Al-Sinkili wrote in Malay and Arabic, with topics including Qur'anic interpretation (tafsir), scholastic theology (kalam), sufism (tasawwuf), and Islamic jurisprudence (fiqh). He wrote around twenty-two books. One of his famous book was titled Mir'ât al Thullab fi Tasyil Ma'rifah al Ahkâm al Syar'iyyah li al Mâlik al-Wahhab. The book discusses the many aspects of fiqh, such as rules and issues concerning marriage, financial transactions, and inheritance.

Some of Shaikh Abd al-Rauf works were published by his students after his death.

Some selected titles of his works, as follows:
 Mir'ât al Thullab fi Tasyil Ma'rifah al Ahkâm al Syar'iyyah li al Mâlik al-Wahhab (fiqh rules for various activities), as requested by Sultanah Safiyatuddin from Aceh.
 Umdat al-Muhtajin ila Suluk Maslak al-Mufridin (sufism)
 Lubb al-Kashf wa al-Bayan li Ma Yarahu al-Muhtadar bi al-'Iyan (dhikr prayer for death preparation)
 Kitab al-Fara'idh (inheritance law)
 Tarjuman al-Mustafid (Qur'an exegesis, mostly from tafsir al-Jalalayn), first complete of Quran interpretation in Malay language.
 Al-Arba'in Haditsan li al-Imam al-Nawawiyah (explanation of Al-Nawawi's forty hadiths)
 Al-Mawa'iz al-Badi (hadith qudsi collection), contains a number of important advice in moral development.
 Kifayat al-Muhtajin ila Masharab al-Muwahhidin al-Qa'ilin bi Wahdat al-Wujud, explanation about wahdatul wujud concept.
 Daqa'iq al-Huruf, teaching about Sufism and theology.
 Risalah Adab Murid akan Syaikh (sufism)
 Risalah Mukhtasarah fi Bayan Shurut al-Shaykh wa al-Murid (sufism)
 Translate of Hadits Arba'in work of Imam Al-Nawawi, as requested by Sultanah Zakiyyatuddin from Aceh.
 Tanbih al-Masyi, contains about tasawwuf.

Teaching 
His interpretation shows tendency of neo-sufism, and combining exoteric and esoteric aspects of Islam. As a sheikh of the Shattariyya, Al-Sinkili did not approve of wujudiyya (pantheism) teaching, but he did not openly oppose it like Al-Raniri.

Death 
Shaikh Abd al-Rauf al-Sinkili died in 1693 at the age of 73. His tomb is located in Deah Raya, around 15 kilometres from Banda Aceh.

References 

1615 births
1693 deaths
People from Aceh
Indonesian people of Iranian descent
Indonesian Sufis
Indonesian Sufi religious leaders